Nine ships of the Royal Navy have been named HMS Conqueror, and another was planned:
  was a 68-gun third rate launched in 1758 and wrecked in 1760.
  was a 74-gun third rate launched in 1773 and broken up in 1794.
  was a 74-gun third rate launched in 1801 and broken up in 1822.
  was a screw-propelled 101-gun first rate, launched in 1855 and wrecked in 1861. 
She was rearmed to 89 guns and converted to steam propulsion in 1859, and was renamed Conqueror in 1862. In 1877 she was renamed Warspite and served as a training ship at for the Marine Society. She was burnt in 1918. 
  was a  monitor launched in 1881 and sold in 1907.
  was an  battleship launched in 1911 and sold in 1922.
  was to have been a  battleship. She was laid down in 1939 but construction was suspended later that year, and she was cancelled entirely in 1945.
  was a  nuclear submarine launched in 1969. The only nuclear submarine ever to sink an enemy warship, she was paid off and laid up in 1990.

Battle honours
Lagos 1759
The Saints 1782
Trafalgar 1805
Jutland 1916
Falklands Islands 1982

Royal Navy ship names